Marie Antoinette, the Love of a King is a 1922 German silent historical drama film directed by Rudolf Meinert and starring Diana Karenne, Maria Reisenhofer and Gustav May. The film depicts the life of Marie Antoinette, Queen of France, during the years leading up to and during the French Revolution in which she was executed.

Cast
Diana Karenne as Marie Antoinette
Maria Reisenhofer as Maria Theresa
Gustav May as Joseph II
Ludwig Hartau as Louis XV.
Viktor Schwanneke as Louis XVI
Ernst Hofmann as Artois
Uschi Elleot as Lamballe
Lia Eibenschütz as Countess Polignac
Olga Limburg as de la Motte
Eugen Burg as Count de la Motte
Erich Kaiser-Titz as Cardinal Rohan
Heinrich Schroth as Count Orleans
Georg H. Schnell as Lafayette
Hermann Vallentin as Mirabeau
Georg John as Robespierre
Max Grünberg as Marat
Ernst Pia as Dr. Guillotin
William Dieterle as Drouet
Henry Bender as Finance Minister
Edmund Löwe as Hue
Rudolf Klein-Rhoden as Böhmer
Emil Stammer as Abt Vermont
Hans Oberg as Simon

Bibliography
Vacche, Angela Dalle. Diva: Defiance and Passion in Early Italian Cinema. University of Texas Press, 2008.

External links

Films about Marie Antoinette
German historical drama films
German silent feature films
Films of the Weimar Republic
Films directed by Rudolf Meinert
1920s historical drama films
German black-and-white films
1922 drama films
Silent historical drama films
1920s German films
1920s German-language films